Ian Chen (Pha̍k-fa-sṳ: Chhîn Nyèn-yún / Chhîn Ngàn-yún ; born 4 February 1991) is a Taiwanese singer, songwriter and actor. He was a former contestant on the fifth season of the television talent show, One Million Star.
He released his first album,  Ian! Vol.01, on 30 May 2014.

Discography

Studio albums

Singles

Compilation albums

Soundtrack albums

Filmography

Film

Television series

Music video

Awards and nominations

References

External links

1991 births
Living people
Taiwanese Mandopop singer-songwriters
Taiwanese male film actors
Taiwanese male television actors
21st-century Taiwanese  male singers
21st-century Taiwanese male actors
People from Nantou County